Roy Emerson and Rod Laver were prevented from defending their title due to the International Lawn Tennis Federation ban on World Championship Tennis contract players competing in their tournaments.

Bob Hewitt and Frew McMillan defeated Arthur Ashe and Dennis Ralston in the final, 4–6, 9–7, 6–8, 6–4, 6–4 to win the gentlemen's doubles title at the 1972 Wimbledon Championships.

Seeds

  Bob Hewitt /  Frew McMillan (champions)
  Stan Smith /  Erik van Dillen (final)
  Pierre Barthès /  Andrés Gimeno (third round)
  Juan Gisbert /  Manuel Orantes (quarterfinals)

Draw

Finals

Top half

Section 1

Section 2

Bottom half

Section 3

Section 4

References

External links

1972 Wimbledon Championships – Men's draws and results at the International Tennis Federation

Men's Doubles
Wimbledon Championship by year – Men's doubles